Joseph-William Gagnon (February 15, 1879 – December 17, 1929) was a politician in the Quebec, Canada. He served as Member of the Legislative Assembly.

Early life

He was born on February 15, 1879, in Yamachiche, Mauricie.
When just 5 years old, Gagnon's father William was killed along with several others in an avalanche during an organised hike in the mountains of Quebec. This strengthened Gagnon's relationship with his mother Elizabeth Darcy-Gagnon. In his memoirs, Gagnon is dedicated his political achievements to "That most admirable woman, whom I loved so dearly".

City Politics

Gagnon served as Mayor of Louiseville from 1922 to 1926.

Provincial Politics

Gagnon ran as a Liberal candidate to the Legislative Assembly of Quebec in 1927 in the district of Maskinongé and won.

Death

He died in office on December 17, 1929.

References

1879 births
1929 deaths
Mayors of places in Quebec
Quebec Liberal Party MNAs